The Challenged Athletes Foundation (CAF), established in 1997,  assists, supports, and provides opportunity to people with physical challenges, so that they can lead active lifestyles and compete in athletic events. It is founded in the belief that involvement in sports at any level increases self-esteem, encourages independence and enhances quality of life. The Foundation does this by providing funding for training, competition, rehabilitation, and equipment for the challenged athletes.

The Challenged Athletes Foundation is divided into four different programs: Access for Athletes, Operation Rebound, Catch a Rising Star, and Project N.Ex.T., all of which focus on the betterment of disabled athletes, but vary in their target group. Access for Athletes is the flagship program of CAF.

History 

Challenged Athletes Foundation was founded in 1997 in response to below-knee-amputee endurance racer Jim MacLaren who suffered an accident while competing in a triathlon. In June 1993, while competing in a triathlon in Orange County, California, MacLaren was on his bike when a van went through a closed intersection, hit the back of the bike and propelled him into a pole. When he arrived at the hospital he was told that he was a quadriplegic and would never move again from the waist down.

Programs and Events

Programs 
The following are programs which CAF offers or supports:

Access for Athletes – this is CAF’s flagship program. It provides funding for equipment, training and travel expenses. In 2011, Access for Athletes satisfied 980 funding requests from challenged athletes in 45 U.S. states and 22 countries. The grants, totaling more than $1.4 million, were used by recipients – of all ages, from beginners to elites – to participate in 47 different sports.
Catch a Rising Star – is a program that provides fun, interactive, nurturing clinics – led by recognized experts and authorities – that provide instruction in basic sports skills. These clinics, which include mentoring from elite CAF athletes, allow participants to develop the confidence and self-esteem required to reach their individual goals. In 2011, CAF held 23 clinics and camps across the United States, reaching 495 physically challenged athletes.
Reach High – is a program provides information, resources and opportunities to people with physical challenges, enabling them to make informed decisions about health, lifestyle and medical choices. The program also raises awareness within the broader community about the abilities of athletes with physical challenges.
Operation Rebound – CAF is a member organization of Operation Rebound, a sports and fitness program for American military personnel, veterans and first responders with permanent physical disabilities. In 2011, CAF Operation Rebound provided 240 grants injured troops and first responders and supported an additional 80 individuals through its Military Medical Center Physical Training Program and CAF events.
Project N.Ex.T. (New Expectations Today) – is a three-year San Diego County pilot program that connects physically challenged mentees with similarly challenged mentors. By educating recently injured or inactive individuals about available fitness and sports opportunities, we believe we can create better and more consistent outcomes for Project N.Ex.T. participants.

Events 
The Challenged Athletes Foundation holds a number of high-profile fund raising events in order to raise money to support disabled athletes to compete in sports. These include CAF events the San Diego Triathlon Challenge; Million Dollar Challenge; Heroes, Heart and Hope Gala held at the Waldorf Astoria in New York City, Hawaii Revisited; Tour de Cove; Rock on the Green and numerous other events under the banner of Race for a Reason.

Athletes 

The Challenged Athletes Foundation has enabled a number of disabled athletes to get to the starting line. Amongst these are Sarah Reinertsen who was the first female leg amputee to complete the Ironman Triathlon World Championships in Kona, Hawaii and a World Marathon Challenge Finisher.

Other well-known challenged athletes include:
Emmanuel Ofosu Yeboah
Rudy Garcia-Tolson
Evan Strong
Rodrick Sewell
Haven Shepherd
Hunter Woodhall
Patty Collins
Kelly Ray
Breezy Bochenek
Alex Parra
Ezra Frech

References

External links
 

Non-profit organizations based in California
Non-profit organizations based in Florida
Parasports organizations
Disability organizations based in the United States